The British Railways Standard Class 5MT  is one of the 12 standard classes of steam locomotive built by British Railways in the 1950s. It was essentially a development of the LMS Stanier Class 5 4-6-0 ("Black Five"). A total of 172 were built between 1951 and 1957.

Background 
William Stanier's Black Five had been the most successful mixed-traffic type in Great Britain. Construction of the Black Fives had started in 1934 and continued past nationalisation to 1951. A new set of 'standard' locomotives was to be built by British Railways, based on LMS designs and incorporating modern ideas.

In particular, the Standard design incorporated features designed to make disposal of the engine after a working "turn" easier: a self-cleaning smokebox and a rocking grate removed the necessity for crews to undertake dirty and strenuous duties at the end of a long shift. This was a necessary investment with the ever-increasing costs of labour following the Second World War.

The original design proposal for the class 5 locomotive had a  wheel arrangement, similar in concept to the Bulleid Light Pacifics that performed impressively during the 1948 Locomotive Exchanges. However this was deemed unnecessarily large and costly for a class 5 power requirement, so the successful LMS Class 5  design was used as the basis instead. The pacific design went on to be enlarged and used for the BR Standard Class 6.

Design and construction 

The design work was done at the ex-LNER Doncaster Works but the bulk of the construction was done at Derby Works. The locomotive featured a BR standard boiler very similar in dimensions to the Stanier Type 3B fitted to the Black Fives, but made from manganese steel instead of nickel steel. Many of these changes were to reduce maintenance or to incorporate standard components that could be shared between other standard classes.

The first of the class, 73000, was outshopped from Derby in April 1951 and 30 were in service by January 1952. There was then a gap in construction before Derby resumed building its remaining 100 engines. 42 were built at Doncaster, starting in August 1955 and finishing in May 1957, with Derby's last engine following a month later.

Thirty engines, numbers 73125 to 73154, were built with Caprotti valve gear and poppet valves.

In service 
These locomotives had a trouble-free introduction in comparison to several of the other Standard classes and were used interchangeably with the pre-nationalisation class 5 engines they supplemented. They were utilised as the haulage power on duties varying from fast passenger trains to slow unfitted freight trains, displaying their versatility.

Different regional allocations had differing tender designs, with locomotives assigned to the Southern Region having tenders with high water capacity to make up for the lack of water troughs.

Like the "Clan" class locomotives, Standard 5s, with their high-stepped running board, were partly conceived to be more economical and serviceable replacements for the Bulleid Pacific, and the Standard Class 5 were fast, they could really fly with good steam, easily to just under 100mph in the view of many engine drivers. Like the Clans, which could only manage one more carriage on an express than a 'Five'  the Standard Fives took a long time to shake down, and only started to really pull when different firing techniques, which allowed them to steam using poor quality coal were developed. They pulled much of the traffic on the last express lines for steam in the mid and late 1960s: Edinburgh-Aberdeen, London- Southampton-Bournemouth- Weymouth and local express traffic in the North and Midlands around Sheffield and Leeds. They were also used on the locals between Liverpool, Manchester and Blackpool, some steam hauled to the last day of steam in 1968.

Naming 

In 1959, 20 of the Southern Region locomotives were named, the names being transferred from SR King Arthur class locos that were then being withdrawn. These were:

Withdrawal

Accidents and incidents

Five people were killed and 40 were injured.
In 1958, locomotive No. 73111 was hauling a passenger train that derailed at Millbrook, Hampshire due to a faulty point motor moving a set of points under the train.

Variations & proposed changes 
The main variation across the class was the valve gear, with 142 using Walschaerts valve gear and the remaining 30 using British Caprotti valve gear. There was little difference in performance between the two groups, but the Caprotti fitted engines had a reputation for being good performers at higher speeds. There was potential for more BR standard locomotives to have Caprotti valve gear fitted as it allowed for longer periods between inspections, offsetting the higher initial cost of this valve gear.

Doncaster had designed double chimneys for the class, similar to the ones used on several of the BR Standard Class 4 4-6-0. If applied, this would have improved the draughting and increased the efficiency of the locomotives. With the Modernisation Plan of 1955 and the good performance of the class from the outset, these plans were shelved permanently.

Another proposal was to produce freight locomotives based from this design in response to criticism by the Western Region on the BR Standard Class 9F. The management believed that the 9Fs were too large and powerful for most heavy freight traffic, along with being more far more expensive to build and operate than the older 2-8-0 locomotives they supplemented. In response to this, the British Transport Commission drew a 2-8-0 Class 8F based on the Standard Class 5, in a manner similar to the LMS class 5 and 8Fs. Changes included a higher boiler pressure of 250 psi and driving wheels 5 ft 0 in (1.524m) in diameter to increase tractive effort. Preparations were made for series production to begin, but the work ceased after the Modernisation Plan was published.

Preservation 
Five members of the class survive and all have steamed in preservation with examples from both builders. 73050 was purchased directly from British Railways for preservation while the other four engines were rescued from Woodham Brothers scrapyard at Barry Island. To date 73096 has been the only member of the class to operate on the main line hauling railtours but in 2018 no. 73082 was moved by rail from its home at the Bluebell Railway to the West Somerset Railway.

Notes

References
 A Detailed History of BR Standard Steam Locomotives, - Vol 2 - The 4-6-0 and 2-6-0 Classes. RCTS 

Atkins, C.P. (1988) The BR Standard 2-8-0s. Rly Wld, 49, 222-3.
Cliffe, Joseph. (2012) It began with 'Turbomotive'. Backtrack, 26, 637.

External links

 http://www.steamindex.com/locotype/brloco.htm#br5

 Southern E-group photo gallery

 
5
Railway locomotives introduced in 1951
4-6-0 locomotives
Standard gauge steam locomotives of Great Britain